Macomb Township is a civil township of Macomb County in the U.S. state of Michigan.  The population was 91,663 at the 2020 Census, which makes it the most-populous civil township in the state.  It is the third most-populous township overall after the charter townships of Clinton and Canton.

Communities

History
The early founders of Macomb Township arrived in the early 19th century in search of flat and fertile farmland, like that near the Clinton River. Many of these early settlers were of German descent, and the German influences remain today. The Township of Macomb was officially approved by the Legislative Council on March 7, 1834.

The township was named in honor of General Alexander Macomb, who was a highly decorated veteran of the War of 1812; his successful mercantile family owned most of Macomb County at one time.

Macomb Township was also a large part of the lumber and logging industry of Southeast Michigan in the late 19th century and early 20th century. Logs would be transported south from Wolcott Mill in Ray Township, down the Middle Branch Clinton River to sawmills. This route became known as Romeo Plank, and is the name of the modern-day road that runs down the same route.

Macomb Township experienced significant growth during the period of 2000–2008, boasting a 48% increase in population.

Geography

Demographics
As of the census of 2010, there were 79,580 people and 27,585 households in the township. There were 27,585 housing units. The racial makeup of the township was 90.5% White, 3.9% African American, 0.2% Native American, 3.1% Asian, 0.0% Pacific Islander, 0.7% from other races, and 1.6% from two or more races. Hispanic or Latino of any race were 2.3% of the population.

As of the census of 2000, there were 50,478 people, 16,946 households, and 14,065 families residing in the township. The racial makeup of the township was 96.12% White, 0.84% African American, 0.19% Native American, 1.41% Asian, 0.01% Pacific Islander, 0.31% from other races, and 1.12% from two or more races. Hispanic or Latino of any race were 1.46% of the population.

There were 16,946 households, out of which 45.3% had children under the age of 18 living with them, 73.7% were married couples living together, 6.5% had a female householder with no husband present, and 17.0% were non-families. 13.7% of all households were made up of individuals, and 3.9% had someone living alone who was 65 years of age or older.  The average household size was 2.97 and the average family size was 3.30.

In the township the population was spread out, with 30.2% under the age of 18, 6.9% from 18 to 24, 35.1% from 25 to 44, 20.3% from 45 to 64, and 7.4% who were 65 years of age or older.  The median age was 34 years. For every 100 females, there were 99.6 males.  For every 100 females age 18 and over, there were 97.3 males.

Education
The public school districts that serve residents of Macomb Township are Chippewa Valley Schools, L'Anse Creuse Public Schools, New Haven Community Schools and Utica Community Schools.  For public library services, the Township is served by the Clinton-Macomb Public Library district.

Media
The township's flagship newspaper is the Macomb Township Chronicle.

Notable people
 Jayson Blair, actor
 Danny DeKeyser, professional hockey player for the Detroit Red Wings
 Mario Impemba, sportscaster, former television broadcaster of the Detroit Tigers
 Bob Learn, Jr., professional ten-pin bowler, five-time champion on PBA Tour
 Masiela Lusha, actress and writer

References

External links

Clinton-Macomb Public Library Website
Official Site Macomb Township
Office Site Macomb Township Parks and Recreation

Townships in Macomb County, Michigan
1834 establishments in Michigan Territory
Townships in Michigan
Populated places established in 1834